Prasophyllum incompositum is a species of orchid endemic to Queensland. It has a single tubular, dark green leaf and up to thirty scented, greenish-brown and white flowers. It has only been recorded from the Carnarvon National Park.

Description
The edges of the upturned part of the labellum are very ruffled and there is a thin, green, fleshy callus in its centre. Flowering occurs in August and September.

Taxonomy and naming
Prasophyllum incompositum was first formally described in 1991 by David Jones from a specimen collected in the Carnarvon National Park and the description was published in Australian Orchid Research. The specific epithet (incompositum) is a Latin word meaning "disarranged" or "confused", referring to the disorganised appearance of the flowering stem.

Distribution and habitat
This leek orchid grows in moist, grassy places in woodland and has only been recorded from the Carnarvon National Park.

References

External links 
 

incompositum
Flora of Queensland
Endemic orchids of Australia
Plants described in 1991